The 1987 NBL season was the ninth season of competition since its establishment in 1979. A total of 14 teams contested the league. Three of the Melbourne-based clubs rebranded themselves in the off season, with the Nundawading Spectres renaming themselves to Eastside Spectres, Coburg Giants became North Melbourne Giants and the St. Kilda Saints became Westside Saints.

Clubs
The NBL had 14 clubs spread across all Australian states and territories with the exception of the Northern Territory.

Regular season
The 1987 regular season took place over 22 rounds between 24 April 1987 and 20 September 1987.

Round 1

|- bgcolor="#CCCCFF" font size=1
!width=90| Date
!width=180| Home
!width=60| Score
!width=180| Away
!width=260| Venue
!width=70| Crowd
!width=70| Box Score

Round 2

|- bgcolor="#CCCCFF" font size=1
!width=90| Date
!width=180| Home
!width=60| Score
!width=180| Away
!width=260| Venue
!width=70| Crowd
!width=70| Box Score

Round 3

|- bgcolor="#CCCCFF" font size=1
!width=90| Date
!width=180| Home
!width=60| Score
!width=180| Away
!width=260| Venue
!width=70| Crowd
!width=70| Box Score

Round 4

|- bgcolor="#CCCCFF" font size=1
!width=90| Date
!width=180| Home
!width=60| Score
!width=180| Away
!width=260| Venue
!width=70| Crowd
!width=70| Box Score

Round 5

|- bgcolor="#CCCCFF" font size=1
!width=90| Date
!width=180| Home
!width=60| Score
!width=180| Away
!width=260| Venue
!width=70| Crowd
!width=70| Box Score

Round 6

|- bgcolor="#CCCCFF" font size=1
!width=90| Date
!width=180| Home
!width=60| Score
!width=180| Away
!width=260| Venue
!width=70| Crowd
!width=70| Box Score

Round 7

|- bgcolor="#CCCCFF" font size=1
!width=90| Date
!width=180| Home
!width=60| Score
!width=180| Away
!width=260| Venue
!width=70| Crowd
!width=70| Box Score

Round 8

|- bgcolor="#CCCCFF" font size=1
!width=90| Date
!width=180| Home
!width=60| Score
!width=180| Away
!width=260| Venue
!width=70| Crowd
!width=70| Box Score

Round 9

|- bgcolor="#CCCCFF" font size=1
!width=90| Date
!width=180| Home
!width=60| Score
!width=180| Away
!width=260| Venue
!width=70| Crowd
!width=70| Box Score

Round 10

|- bgcolor="#CCCCFF" font size=1
!width=90| Date
!width=180| Home
!width=60| Score
!width=180| Away
!width=260| Venue
!width=70| Crowd
!width=70| Box Score

Round 11

|- bgcolor="#CCCCFF" font size=1
!width=90| Date
!width=180| Home
!width=60| Score
!width=180| Away
!width=260| Venue
!width=70| Crowd
!width=70| Box Score

Round 12

|- bgcolor="#CCCCFF" font size=1
!width=90| Date
!width=180| Home
!width=60| Score
!width=180| Away
!width=260| Venue
!width=70| Crowd
!width=70| Box Score

Round 13

|- bgcolor="#CCCCFF" font size=1
!width=90| Date
!width=180| Home
!width=60| Score
!width=180| Away
!width=260| Venue
!width=70| Crowd
!width=70| Box Score

Round 14

|- bgcolor="#CCCCFF" font size=1
!width=90| Date
!width=180| Home
!width=60| Score
!width=180| Away
!width=260| Venue
!width=70| Crowd
!width=70| Box Score

Round 15

|- bgcolor="#CCCCFF" font size=1
!width=90| Date
!width=180| Home
!width=60| Score
!width=180| Away
!width=260| Venue
!width=70| Crowd
!width=70| Box Score

Round 16

|- bgcolor="#CCCCFF" font size=1
!width=90| Date
!width=180| Home
!width=60| Score
!width=180| Away
!width=260| Venue
!width=70| Crowd
!width=70| Box Score

Round 17

|- bgcolor="#CCCCFF" font size=1
!width=90| Date
!width=180| Home
!width=60| Score
!width=180| Away
!width=260| Venue
!width=70| Crowd
!width=70| Box Score

Round 18

|- bgcolor="#CCCCFF" font size=1
!width=90| Date
!width=180| Home
!width=60| Score
!width=180| Away
!width=260| Venue
!width=70| Crowd
!width=70| Box Score

Round 19

|- bgcolor="#CCCCFF" font size=1
!width=90| Date
!width=180| Home
!width=60| Score
!width=180| Away
!width=260| Venue
!width=70| Crowd
!width=70| Box Score

Round 20

|- bgcolor="#CCCCFF" font size=1
!width=90| Date
!width=180| Home
!width=60| Score
!width=180| Away
!width=260| Venue
!width=70| Crowd
!width=70| Box Score

Round 21

|- bgcolor="#CCCCFF" font size=1
!width=90| Date
!width=180| Home
!width=60| Score
!width=180| Away
!width=260| Venue
!width=70| Crowd
!width=70| Box Score

Round 22

|- bgcolor="#CCCCFF" font size=1
!width=90| Date
!width=180| Home
!width=60| Score
!width=180| Away
!width=260| Venue
!width=70| Crowd
!width=70| Box Score

Ladder

The NBL tie-breaker system as outlined in the NBL Rules and Regulations states that in the case of an identical win–loss record, the results in games played between the teams will determine order of seeding.

1Head-to-Head between Brisbane Bullets and Illawarra Hawks (1-1). Brisbane Bullets won For and Against (+11).

2Head-to-Head between Eastside Spectres and Geelong Cats (1-1). Eastside Spectres won For and Against (+7).

Finals

Playoff bracket

Elimination Finals

|- bgcolor="#CCCCFF" font size=1
!width=90| Date
!width=180| Home
!width=60| Score
!width=180| Away
!width=260| Venue
!width=70| Crowd
!width=70| Box Score

Semi-finals

|- bgcolor="#CCCCFF" font size=1
!width=90| Date
!width=180| Home
!width=60| Score
!width=180| Away
!width=260| Venue
!width=70| Crowd
!width=70| Box Score

Grand Final

|- bgcolor="#CCCCFF" font size=1
!width=90| Date
!width=180| Home
!width=60| Score
!width=180| Away
!width=260| Venue
!width=70| Crowd
!width=70| Box Score

1987 NBL statistics leaders

NBL awards
Most Valuable Player: Mark Davis, Adelaide 36ers & Leroy Loggins, Brisbane Bullets
Most Valuable Player Grand Final: Leroy Loggins, Brisbane Bullets
Rookie of the Year: Greg Hubbard, Illawarra Hawks
Coach of the Year: David Lindstrom, Illawarra Hawks

All NBL Team

References

 
NBL